The 2012 FIM Dansk Metal Danish Speedway Grand Prix was the fifth race of the 2012 Speedway Grand Prix season. It took place on 9 June at the Parken Stadium in Copenhagen, Denmark.

The Grand Prix was won by Jason Crump who beat Fredrik Lindgren, Greg Hancock and Chris Harris. Jarosław Hampel was injured in Heat 1 (right leg' fibula broken) and was out for next four SGP events and World Cup also.

Riders 
The Speedway Grand Prix Commission nominated Michael Jepsen Jensen as Wild Card, and Peter Kildemand and Mikkel B. Jensen both as Track Reserves. The Draw was made on June 8.

Results

Heat details

Heat after heat 
 (56,9) Holder, Andersen, Bjerre, MB Jensen (Kildemand T/-), (Hampel F/-)
 (55,9) Hancock, Lindgren, Sayfutdinov, Gollob
 (57,0) Ljung, Crump, Harris, B. Pedersen
 (55,8) N. Pedersen, Lindbäck, MJ Jensen, Jonsson (R)
 (55,3) N. Pedersen, Holder, Lindgren, Crump
 (57,8) Gollob, MJ Jensen, Ljung, Andersen
 (56,5) Harris, Hancock, Bjerre, Lindbäck
 (56,2) Sayfutdinov, Jonsson, B. Pedersen, Kildemand
 (55,4) Jonsson, Harris, Holder, Gollob
 (57,9) B. Pedersen, Andersen, Lindgren, Lindbäck
 (58,2) Sayfutdinov, Bjerre, Crump, MJ Jensen
 (57,8) MB Jensen, Hancock, Ljung, N. Pedersen
 (56,9) Hancock, B. Pedersen, MJ Jensen, Holder (X)
 (57,5) Sayfutdinov, Harris, N. Pedersen, Andersen
 (55,9) Lindgren, Jonsson, Ljung, Bjerre (R)
 (57,2) Crump, Kildemand, Lindbäck, Gollob
 (57,9) Holder, Ljung, Sayfutdinov, Lindbäck
 (57,6) Crump, Hancock, Jonsson, Andersen
 (56,8) B. Pedersen, N. Pedersen, Bjerre, Gollob
 (57,5) MJ Jensen, Lindgren, MB Jensen, Harris
 Semifinals
 (57,9) Hancock, Lindgren, N. Pedersen (X), Holder (X)
 (57,3) Crump, Harris, B. Pedersen, Sayfutdinov (X)
 the Final
 (56,9) Crump, Lindgren, Hancock, Harris

The intermediate classification

References

See also 
 motorcycle speedway

Denmark
2012
2012 in Danish motorsport